Arthur Cayley (1821 – 1895) is the eponym of all the things listed below.

 Cayley absolute
 Cayley algebra
 Cayley computer algebra system
 Cayley diagrams – used for finding cognate linkages in mechanical engineering
 Cayley graph
 Cayley numbers
 Cayley plane
 Cayley table
 Cayley transform
 Cayleyan
 Cayley–Bacharach theorem
 Cayley–Dickson construction
 Cayley–Hamilton theorem in linear algebra
 Cayley–Klein metric
 Cayley–Klein model of hyperbolic geometry
 Cayley–Menger determinant
 Cayley–Purser algorithm
 Cayley's formula
 Cayley's hyperdeterminant
 Cayley's mousetrap — a card game
 Cayley's nodal cubic surface
 Cayley normal 2-complement theorem
 Cayley's ruled cubic surface
 Cayley's sextic
 Cayley's theorem
 Cayley's Ω process
 Chasles–Cayley–Brill formula
 Grassmann–Cayley algebra
 The crater Cayley on the Moon

Cayley, Arthur